William Furphy (born 7 May 1966) was an English footballer. Although born in London he played all of his professional career in Scotland - with Ayr United, Kilmarnock, Montrose, Dumbarton, Ross County, Stranraer and Elgin City. Following his retiral from playing he took up the assistant manager's post at Elgin City.

References

1966 births
Living people
Footballers from Greater London
English footballers
Dumbarton F.C. players
Kilmarnock F.C. players
Montrose F.C. players
Ayr United F.C. players
Ross County F.C. players
Stranraer F.C. players
Elgin City F.C. players
Scottish Football League players
Association football central defenders